Cystathioninuria, also called cystathionase deficiency, is an autosomal recessive metabolic disorder. It is characterized by an abnormal accumulation of plasma cystathionine leading to excess cystathionine in the urine. Hereditary cystathioninuria is associated with the reduced activity of the enzyme cystathionine gamma-lyase. It is considered a biochemical anomaly. This is because it associated with a wide range of diseases and its inconsistency.

Cystathionase catalyzes cystathionine to cysteine and α-ketobutyrate. Cysteine is an essential amino acid and its conversion from cystathionine occurs in the trans-sulfuration pathway. The availability of cysteine is necessary for the synthesis of an important anti-oxidant, glutathione. Cystathionase has a co-enzyme, pyridoxal phosphate, which is the active form the vitamin B6.  This means that vitamin B6 is essential for the function of cystathionase.

Cystathioninuria can be broken down into two main categories. Primary cystathioninuria is caused by the recessive inherited deficiency of cystathionase enzyme. Secondary cystathioninuria is described by non-genetic conditions of excess cystathionine. Secondary cystathioninuria includes temporary excess cystathionine of premature infants, severe generalized liver damage, thyrotoxicosis, hepatoblastoma, or neuroblastoma. Cases of secondary cystathioninuria are not responsive to vitamin B6 administration.

Types
Under primary cystathioninuria, the inherited mutation of CTH gene, there are two forms. There is vitamin B6 – unresponsive and vitamin B6 – responsive cystathioninuria. The vitamin B6 – unresponsive form is thought to be from a lack of the synthesis of cystathionase. This means that the mutation in CTH from this form of cystathioninuria, results in the absence of cystathionase. It could also result from the synthesis of a cystathionase that is so greatly mutated it cannot function at all. On the other hand, vitamin B6 – responsive form still has synthesis of cystathionase. However, the cystathionase has an altered ability to bind to vitamin B6, its coenzyme. This changed interaction lowers the efficiency of cystathionase, so it cannot convert cystathionine as well.

Genetics

Cystathioninuria is inherited in an autosomal recessive manner. This means the defective gene responsible for the disorder is located on an autosome, and two copies of the defective gene (one inherited from each parent) are required in order to be born with the disorder. The parents of an individual with an autosomal recessive disorder both carry one copy of the defective gene, but usually do not experience any signs or symptoms of the disorder.

Interestingly, homozygotes and heterozygotes were able to be distinguished in one study through both plasma and urinary levels of cystathionine. The homozygote individuals had cystathionine levels greater than 0.5 moles per milligram of creatinine. Each of the homozygote individuals had a significant amount of cystathionine in the plasma as well. In contrast, the heterozygote individuals excreted approximately one tenth the amount of cystathionine as the homozygote individuals. The heterozygote individuals also had no detectable amounts of cystathionine in their plasma.

The gene for cystathionase, CTH, has been sequenced and multiple mutations have been shown to be associated with the development of cystathioninuria. Two nonsense mutations were found in exon 8 and exon 11 of CTH. Two missense mutations were also found, mainly in exon 2 and exon 7. In addition, a common non-synonymous single nucleotide polymorphism in exon 12 was also identified. The presence of various CTH mutations is consistent with the various categories associated with cystathioninuria.

Diagnosis
The main way to diagnosis cystathioninuria is simply through increased urinary excretion of cystathionine. In some cases, a genetic test is employed.

Treatment
The treatment, if any is available, varies depending on the category of cystathioninuria a patient has. The vitamin B6 – responsive form is best treated by an increased consumption of vitamin B6. This increased consumption helps with cystathionase's altered ability to bind to the active form of vitamin B6.

References

External links

Amino acid metabolism disorders
Autosomal recessive disorders